On the Loose may refer to:

On the Loose (1931 film), a comedy film produced and directed by Hal Roach
On the Loose (1951 film), a 1951 American film
On the Loose (1984 film), a 1984 Australian film
On the Loose (1985 film), a Swedish film directed by Staffan Hildebrand
On the Loose (EP), the soundtrack to the 1985 film, recorded by the Swedish hard rock band Europe
"On the Loose" (Niall Horan song), 2018
"On the Loose" (Marty Rhone song), 1976
"On the Loose", a song by Saga on their album Worlds Apart
On the Loose!, an album by British pop group Deuce
On the Loose (outing club), an outing club for the Claremont Colleges in Claremont, California, United States